Ali ibn Isa ibn Mahan was a prominent Iranian military leader of the Abbasid Caliphate in the late 8th and early 9th centuries.

Origin and early career
Ali's father, Isa ibn Mahan, was an early follower and da'i of the Abbasids; he mutinied after the Abbasid Revolution and was executed by Abu Muslim. Ali himself appears first in 779/80, under Caliph al-Mahdi, as commander of the caliphal guard (ḥaras). He then served as commander of the guard of the heir-apparent al-Hadi, and continued in the post after the latter's accession. Under al-Hadi, he also occupied the posts of secretary of the army department (diwan al-jund), the powerful post of chamberlain (hajib) and director of the treasures.

Governorship of Khurasan under Harun al-Rashid
Under Harun al-Rashid he continued to serve as commander of the guard until 796, when he was named governor of Khurasan, over the objections of Yahya al-Barmaki. As a leader of the abna al-dawla, the troops that formed the core of the Abbasid army in Iraq, he antagonized the Khurasanis and oppressed them through heavy taxation, with the revenue diverted for the upkeep of the abna and for filling his own coffers; during his eight-year tenure, he amassed a vast fortune.

His misgovernment provoked widespread discontent, and a spate of Kharijite uprisings. In April 805, as more and more complaints reached Harun, he went to Rayy to inspect the situation for himself. However, when Ali came and presented himself before the Caliph, he brought with him an enormous treasure in precious objects—worth 30 million gold dinars according to one source—which he liberally distributed to the Caliph's entourage and family. As a result, Harun not only kept him in place, but even accompanied him for part of his return journey, a rare mark of honour.

Eventually, Ali's misconduct resulted in the outbreak of a major rebellion under Rafi ibn al-Layth, which eventually required the personal intervention of Harun al-Rashid in 808.

Return to prominence under al-Amin and the civil war
Replaced by Harthama ibn A'yan and disgraced, Ali rose again to prominence after the death of Harun in March 809. As many of the Baghdadi elites, he was a strong supporter of the new Caliph, al-Amin, who honoured him with the appellation shaykh hadhihi'l-dawla ("elder of this dynasty") and put him in charge of the affairs of his own heir, Musa.

In early 811, with the outbreak of civil war between al-Amin and his brother al-Ma'mun, who had been given a large viceregal domain encompassing Khurasan, al-Amin entrusted Ali with the subduing al-Ma'mun and his followers. At the head of a huge army of reportedly 50,000 men drawn from the abna, Ali marched east, but in the Battle of Rayy on 3 July 811 he was crushingly defeated and killed by a far smaller army of al-Ma'mun under Tahir ibn al-Husayn.

Descendants
Of his sons, Isa served his father as deputy governor for Sistan, but was killed by Rafi ibn al-Layth's supporters in 807. Another son, al-Husayn, also served in Sistan during Ali's governorship of Khurasan, and suppressed an anti-Abbasid rebellion and recruited troops in Syria in 811/2. With the advance of al-Ma'mun's troops, which led to the Siege of Baghdad (812–813), al-Husayn briefly imprisoned al-Amin and tried to rouse the citizens of Baghdad to switch their allegiance to al-Ma'mun, but failed and was killed.

References

Sources
 
 
 
 
 

8th-century births
811 deaths
8th-century Iranian people
9th-century Iranian people
Generals of the Abbasid Caliphate
Abbasid governors of Khurasan
Fourth Fitna
8th-century people from the Abbasid Caliphate
9th-century people from the Abbasid Caliphate